David Polsky is an American film and television screenwriter who created The Buzz on Maggie and co-wrote Scary Movie 2. He has also written episodes for My Little Pony: Friendship Is Magic and Hanazuki: Full of Treasures among other animated television series. Polsky co-produced the 2019 animated film Abominable.

Filmography

Television
Singled Out, writer, 130 episodes
South Park, writer, 2 episodes
The Cramp Twins, writer, 2 episodes
Cedric the Entertainer Presents, writer, 17 episodes
The Buzz on Maggie, creator & executive producer
Class of 3000, writer, 7 episodes
FrankTV, writer, 28 episodes
Pair of Kings, writer, 2 episodes
Sonic Boom, writer, 2 episodes
My Little Pony: Friendship Is Magic, writer, 13 episodes
My Little Pony: Equestria Girls Special, writer
Dawn of the Croods, writer, 2 episodes
Littlest Pet Shop: A World of Our Own, writer, 1 episode
Hanazuki: Full of Treasures, executive producer & writer, 8 episodes
 Nella the Princess Knight, writer, 1 episode

Film
Scary Movie 2, writer

References

External links

Interview with Dave Polsky on True Equestria Radio, 12/29/2013 

American male screenwriters
Television producers from Pennsylvania
Year of birth missing (living people)
American television writers
Living people
Writers from Pittsburgh
American male television writers
Screenwriters from Pennsylvania
Disney Television Animation people